The 2016–17 Season Play-off for the 2016–17 Hong Kong football season was the 5th season of the tournament.

The play-off semi-finals are played were single elimination ties, contested by the teams who finished in 2nd and 3rd place in the Premier League table, the winners of the Senior Challenge Shield and the champions of the FA Cup. The winners of the semi-finals went through to the final, with the winner of the final gaining participation for the 2018 AFC Champions League qualifying play-off.

Eastern defeated Southern in the final to win the play-offs. This is the last edition of the play-offs, and in future seasons the AFC Champions League and/or AFC Cup play-off place will be decided by the FA Cup.

Qualified

Premier League

Senior Challenge Shield

The winners of the Senior Challenge Shield will guarantee a place in the play-off.

Winners:
 Kitchee

FA Cup

The winners of the FA Cup will guarantee a place in the play-off.

Winners:
 Kitchee

Bracket

Fixtures and results

Semi-finals

Final

References 

Football competitions in Hong Kong
Season Play-off